The Best American Poetry 1996, a volume in The Best American Poetry series, was edited by David Lehman and by guest editor Adrienne Rich.

Poets and poems included

See also
 1996 in poetry

Notes

External links
 Web page for contents of the book, with links to each publication where the poems originally appeared
 Drumvoices Revue, vol. 4 -- Raymond Patterson's "Harlem Suite" is on p. 136-137

Best American Poetry series
1996 poetry books
American poetry anthologies